Scott Davis (born 22 April 1979) is a former Australian professional road bicycle racer, last for UCI Pro Tour Team .

Born in Bundaberg, Queensland, he currently lives in Bundaberg, QLD.

He is the brother of fellow cyclist, Allan Davis.

Major results

1997
 1st  World U-19 Team Pursuit Champion
1999
 1st Stage 1 Tour of Tasmania
2001
 3rd Overall Tour of Japan
2002
 3rd Overall Baby Giro
2006
 2nd Stage 1 Tour of California
2008
 8th Neuseen Classics
2009
 1st Stage 8 Tour of Gippsland

External links

1979 births
Living people
Cyclists from Queensland
Australian male cyclists
Sportspeople from Bundaberg
Sportsmen from Queensland
20th-century Australian people
21st-century Australian people